Marzec is a Polish surname meaning "March". Notable people with the surname include:
 Mateusz Marzec, Polish footballer
 Piotr Marzec (born 1971), Polish rapper and politician
 Ryszard Marzec (1931-1972), Polish field hockey player

Polish-language surnames